This is a list of compositions by Mikhail Ippolitov-Ivanov. Dates indicate the year of composition. Dates with an asterisk (1895*) may need revising.

Works by category

Works for orchestra

Op. 1:  Yar-khmel ("Spring") Overture, unpublished (1881)
Op. 2:  Scherzo for large orchestra, unpublished (after 1881*)
 -      Nine Caucasian Dances for Georgian folk instruments and performers (1883)

Op. 10:  Caucasian Sketches, Suite No. 1 (1894)
1. In a Mountain Pass
2. In the Village
3. In the Mosque
4. Procession of the Sardar
Op. 34:  Sinfonietta for orchestra (arrangement for large orchestra of Violin Sonata Op. 8) (1902*)
Op. 42:  Caucasian Sketches, Suite No. 2 "Iveria" (1896)
1. Introduction (Lamentation of the Princess Ketevana)
2. Berceuse
3. Lezghinka
4. Georgian March
Op. 46:  Symphony No. 1 in E minor (1907)
1. Adagio - Allegro risoluto
2. Scherzo: Allegro
3. Elegy: Larghetto
4. Finale: Allegro moderato
Op. 48:  Armenian Rhapsody on National Themes, for orchestra (1895)
Op. 50:  On the Volga, musical picture for orchestra (1910*)
Op. 55:  Turkish March, for large orchestra (also for concert band) (1926)
Op. 56:  From the Songs of Ossian - 3 musical pictures for large orchestra (1925)
1. Lake Lyano
2. Kolyma's Lament
3. Ossian's Monologue on Contemporary Heroes
Op. 62:  Turkish Fragments - Orchestral Suite No. 3 (1930)
1. The Caravan
2. In the Encampment
3. At Night
4. At the Festival
Op. 65:  On the Steppes of Turkmenistan - Orchestral Suite No. 4 (1935)
Op. 67:  Jubilee March ded. Voroshilov - for the 15th anniversary of the 1917 Revolution, for large orchestra (also arr. piano) (1933)
Op. 69:  Musical Paintings from Uzbekistan - Orchestral Suite No. 5 (1935*)
 -        Symphony No. 2 "Karelia", without Opus no. (1935)
Op. 79:  Catalan Suite for orchestra (1932*)

Film music
Music for the silent film Stenka Razin (directed by Vladimir Romashkov) (1908)
Music for the lost silent film Song About the Merchant Kalashnikov (directed by Vasily Goncharov) (1909)
Music for the silent film Volga and Siberia (aka Yermak Timofeyevich) (dir. Vasily Goncharov) (1914)
- Music for the unreleased film Kara-bugaz (Black Mouth) (dir. Aleksandr Razumny) (1934)

Works for soloist and orchestra
Op. 54:  Mtsyri, symphonic poem for soprano and orchestra, (after Mikhail Lermontov) (also arr. soprano and piano) (1923 - 1924)
Op. 61:  An Episode from the Life of Franz Schubert: Symphonic Picture for Tenor (ad lib.) and large orchestra (1928)
Op. 64:  Village Evenings: Fantasy on themes for balalaikas and large orchestra (also for balalaikas and piano) (1934*)

Operas
Op. 6:  Ruth (opera after Tolstoy and Ostrovsky) (1883 - 1886)
 -      Azra (opera after a Moorish legend and Mickiewicz) without Opus no. (destroyed by the composer) (1888 - 1890)
Op. 30:  Assya (opera after Manykin-Nevstruev and Turgenev) (1900)
Op. 43:  Treason (opera after Aleksandr Sumbatov-Yuzhin) (1908 - 1909)
Op. 53:  Ole from the North Country (opera, libretto by Ippolitov-Ivanov after M. Jersen) (1915, fp 1916)
Op. 70:  Marriage (orchestration of Mussorgsky's opera after Gogol) (1931)
Op. 74:  The Last Barricade (opera after Nikolai Kratsyeninnikov) (1933)

Works for choir & orchestra
Op. 12:  Welcoming Cantata for the Coronation of Nicholas II. for two-part children's choir and orchestra (1895)
Op. 18:  Five Characteristic Pictures, for choir and orchestra (also for piano) (1897)
1. Rusalki
2. Peasant melody
3. Berber melody
4. Nocturne
5. Spring
Op. 59:  Hymn to Work, for two-part children's chorus, concert band and orchestra (1927)
Op. 71:  The Year 1917, (Anniversary March) for children's and mixed choir, concert band and orchestra (also arr. piano) (1932)

Other works for chorus
Op. 15a: Alsatian Ballade, for mixed choir (or women) (1896)
Op. 16:  Ten two-part choruses for female voices and piano (1896)
Op. 17:  Five four-part choruses, for mixed choir (after Kozlov) (1896)
Op. 24:  Legend of the White Swan of Novgorod, for mixed choir (1898)
Op. 26:  Cantata in Memory of Pushkin, for children's choir with piano (or harmonium) (1899)
Op. 29:  Two evening meal verses (Psalm 132 and Psalm 133), for mixed choir (1899)
Op. 32:  Five Choruses, for three-part children's or women's choir and piano, unpublished (1901*)
Op. 35:  Cantata in Memory of Vasily Zhukovsky (after Weinberg), for mixed choir and piano (1902)
Op. 37:  Liturgy of St. John Chrysostom, for mixed chorus (1903)
Op. 38:  Five Cherubic Hymns, for female chorus (1903)
Op. 39;  Pythagorean Hymn to the Rising Sun, (after Amfiteatrov) for mixed chorus, ten flutes, two harps and organ (1904)
Op. 43a:  Selected prayers from the All-Night Vigil (Vespers), for mixed choir (1909*)
Op. 47:  Cantata for the 100th anniversary of Gogol, for two-part children's chorus with piano (1909)
Op. 49:  Kontakion for the Holy Apostle Matthew, for cantor and mixed choir (1910*)
Op. 51:  Fifteen children's choruses (after Nekrasov) (1910*)
Op. 54a:  Troparion to Celebrate the Phenomenon of the Icons of the Mother of God in the city of Kazan, for mixed choir and piano (1925*)
Op. 75:  Three Vocal Quartets for male chorus and piano (after Rodionov) (1931)

Solo vocal music
Op. 3:  Ten children's songs (1881)
Op. 4:  Seven songs (after Pushkin and Lermontov) (1881*)
Op. 5:  Four Romances for voice and piano (1886)
Op. 11:  Suite, for voice and piano (1885)
Op. 14:  Twelve Georgian Folk-Songs for voice and piano (1895)
Op. 14a:  Six Songs (after Balmont) (1896)
Op. 15:  Three Songs for voice and piano (1896)
Op. 21:  Six Romances (after Rathaus) (1897)
Op. 22:  Six Romances (after Golenishchev-Kutusov) (1897)
Op. 23:  Three Moorish Melodies (after Spanish folk texts tr. Botkin) (1897)
Op. 25:  Five Duets for mezzo-soprano, viola and piano (after Rathaus) (1898)
Op. 27:  Two Romances (after Zhukovsky) for voice and piano (1899)
Op. 28:  Five Romances (after Maikov) for voice and piano (1899)
Op. 31:  Four Songs (after Amfiteatrov) for voice and piano (1901)
Op. 33:  Six Romances (after Rathaus) for voice and piano (1901)
Op. 40:  Five Biblical Songs for voice and piano (1904)
Op. 41:  Seven Psalms of King David, for voice and piano (or harp) (1905)
Op. 44:  Five Songs (after D. Zerteljew) for voice and piano, unpublished (1909*)
Op. 45:  Ten Shakespeare Sonnets for voice and piano(1913)
Op. 52:  Four Duets (after Maikov) for voices and piano, unpublished (1910*)
Op. 53a:  Four Songs from Provence (after Paul Verlaine tr. Larin) for voice and piano (1916*)
Op. 58:  Three Songs for voice and piano (1925*)
Op. 60:  Five Japanese poems (after Tomonori & anon. tr. Gluskina) for voice and piano (1928)
Op. 63:  Four Songs for voice, violin, cello and piano (after Solovyov) (1933)
Op. 66:  Two Bylinki (Folk Epics) - songs for voice and piano (1933)
Op. 68:  Four Poems (after Tagore), for high voice, flute (or violin) and piano (or harp) (1935)
Op. 72:  Five Romances for voice, violin, cello and piano (1932)
Op. 73:  Two Duets for high and low voice with piano (after Rodionov) (1932)
 -       Three Kirgiz Songs for voice, flute oboe, clarinet and bassoon, without Opus no. (1931)

Chamber music
Op. 8:  Violin Sonata (1895)
Op. 9:  Piano Quartet (1895*)
Op. 13:  String Quartet in A minor (1894)
Op. 19:  Desire, for cello and piano (later revised as Op. 57) (1897)
Op. 20:  Romantic Ballad - Suite for violin and piano (1898)
Op. 57:  Desire, for cello and piano, (revised from Op. 19) (1925)
 -       Four Pieces on Armenian Themes for string quartet without Opus no. (1934)
Op. 69a:  An Evening in Georgia, for flute, oboe, clarinet, bassoon and harp (1935)

Works for piano

Op. 7:  Five Small Pieces for piano (1885)

Works by Opus no.

Op. 1:  Yar-khmel ("Spring") Overture, unpublished (1881)
Op. 2:  Scherzo for large orchestra, unpublished (after 1881*)
Op. 3:  Ten children's songs (1881)
Op. 4:  Seven songs (after Pushkin and Lermontov) (1881*)
 -      Nine Caucasian Dances for Georgian folk instruments and performers (1883)

Op. 5:  Four Romances for voice and piano (1886)
Op. 6:  Ruth (opera after Tolstoy and Ostrovsky) (1883 - 1886)
Op. 7:  Five Small Pieces for piano (1885)
Op. 8:  Violin Sonata (1895)
Op. 9:  Piano Quartet (1895*)
 -      Azra (opera after a Moorish legend and Mickiewicz) without Opus no. (destroyed by the composer) (1888 - 1890)
Op. 10:  Caucasian Sketches, Suite No. 1 (1894)
1. In a Mountain Pass
2. In the Village
3. In the Mosque
4. Procession of the Sardar
Op. 11:  Suite, for voice and piano (1885)
Op. 12:  Welcoming Cantata for the Coronation of Nicholas II. for two-part children's choir and orchestra (1895)
Op. 13:  String Quartet in A minor (1894)
Op. 14:  Twelve Georgian Folk-Songs (1895)
Op. 14a:  Six Songs (after Balmont) (1896)
Op. 15:  Three Songs for voice and piano (1896)
Op. 15a:  Alsatian Ballade, for mixed choir (or women) (1896)
Op. 16:  Ten two-part choruses for female voices and piano (1896)
Op. 17:  Five four-part choruses, for mixed choir (after Kozlov) (1896)
Op. 18:  Five Characteristic Pictures, for choir and orchestra (also for piano) (1897)
1. Rusalki
2. Peasant melody
3. Berber melody
4. Nocturne
5. Spring
Op. 19:  Desire, for cello and piano (later revised as Op.57) (1897)
Op. 20:  Romantic Ballad - Suite for violin and piano (1898)
Op. 21:  Six Romances (after Rathaus) (1897)
Op. 22:  Six Romances (after Golenishchev-Kutusov) (1897)
Op. 23:  Three Moorish Melodies (after Spanish folk texts tr. Botkin) (1897)
Op. 24:  Legend of the White Swan of Novgorod, for mixed choir (1898)
Op. 25:  Five Duets for mezzo-soprano, viola and piano (after Rathaus) (1898)
Op. 26:  Cantata in Memory of Pushkin, for children's choir with piano (or harmonium) (1899)
Op. 27:  Two Romances (after Zhukovsky) for voice and piano (1899)
Op. 28:  Five Romances (after Maikov) for voice and piano (1899)
Op. 29:  Two evening meal verses (Psalm 132 and Psalm 133), for mixed choir (1899)
Op. 30:  Assya (opera after Manykin-Nevstruev and Turgenev) (1900)
Op. 31:  Four Songs (after Amfiteatrov) for voice and piano (1901)
Op. 32:  Five Choruses, for three-part children's or women's choir and piano, unpublished (1901*)
Op. 33:  Six Romances (after Rathaus) for voice and piano (1901)
Op. 34:  Sinfonietta for orchestra (arrangement for large orchestra of Violin Sonata Op. 8) (1902*)
Op. 35:  Cantata in Memory of Vasily Zhukovsky (after Weinberg), for mixed choir and piano (1902)
Op. 37:  Liturgy of St. John Chrysostom, for mixed chorus (1903)
Op. 38:  Five Cherubic Hymns, for female chorus (1903)
Op. 39;  Pythagorean Hymn to the Rising Sun, (after Amfiteatrov) for mixed chorus, ten flutes, two harps and organ (1904)
Op. 40:  Five Biblical Songs for voice and piano (1904)
Op. 41:  Seven Psalms of King David, for voice and piano (or harp) (1905)
Op. 42:  Caucasian Sketches, Suite No. 2 (1896)
1. Introduction (Lamentation of the Princess Ketevana)
2. Berceuse
3. Lezghinka
4. Georgian War March
- Music for the silent film Stenka Razin (directed by Vladimir Romashkov) (1908)
Op. 43:  Treason (opera after Aleksandr Sumbatov-Yuzhin) (1908 - 1909)
Op. 43a:  Selected prayers from the All-Night Vigil (Vespers), for mixed choir (1909*)
- Music for the lost silent film Song About the Merchant Kalashnikov (Vasily Goncharov) (1909)
Op. 44:  Five Songs (after D. Zerteljew) for voice and piano, unpublished (1909*)
Op. 45:  Ten Shakespeare Sonnets for voice and piano(1913)
Op. 46:  Symphony No. 1 in E minor (1907)
1. Adagio - Allegro risoluto
2. Scherzo: Allegro
3. Elegy: Larghetto
4. Finale: Allegro moderato
Op. 47:  Cantata for the 100th anniversary of Gogol, for two-part children's chorus with piano (1909)
Op. 48:  Armenian Rhapsody on National Themes, for orchestra (1895)
Op. 49:  Kontakion for the Holy Apostle Matthew, for cantor and mixed choir (1910*)
Op. 50:  On the Volga, musical picture for orchestra (1910*)
Op. 51:  Fifteen children's choruses (after Nekrasov) (1910*)
Op. 52:  Four Duets (after Maikov) for voices and piano, unpublished (1910*)
- Music for the silent film Volga and Siberia (aka Yermak Timofeyevich) (Vasily Goncharov) (1914)
Op. 53:  Ole from the North Country (opera, libretto by Ippolitov-Ivanov after M. Jersen) (1915, fp 1916)
Op. 53a:  Four Songs from Provence (after Paul Verlaine tr. Larin) for voice and piano (1916*)
Op. 54:  Mtsïri, symphonic poem for soprano and orchestra, (after Lermontov) (also arr. soprano and piano) (1923 - 1924)
Op. 54a:  Troparion to Celebrate the Phenomenon of the Icons of the Mother of God in the city of Kazan, for mixed choir and piano (1925*)
Op. 55:  Turkish March, for large orchestra (also for concert band) (1926)
Op. 56:  From the Songs of Ossian - 3 musical pictures for large orchestra (1925)
1. Lake Lyano
2. Kolyma's Lament
3. Ossian's Monologue on Contemporary Heroes
Op. 57:  Desire, for cello and piano, (revised from Op. 19) (1925)
Op. 58:  Three Songs for voice and piano (1925*)
Op. 59:  Hymn to Work, for two-part children's chorus, concert band and orchestra (1927)
Op. 60:  Five Japanese poems (after Tomonori & anon. tr. Gluskina) for voice and piano (1928)
Op. 61:  An Episode from the Life of Franz Schubert: Symphonic Picture for Tenor (ad lib.) and large orchestra (1928)
Op. 62:  Turkish Fragments - Orchestral Suite No. 3 (1930)
1. The Caravan
2. In the Encampment
3. At Night
4. At the Festival
Op. 63:  Four Songs for voice, violin, cello and piano (after Solovyov) (1933)
 -       Four Pieces on Armenian Themes for string quartet without Opus no. (1934)
Op. 64:  Village Evenings: Fantasy on themes for balalaikas and large orchestra (also for balalaikas and piano) (1934*)
Op. 65:  On the Steppes of Turkmenistan - Orchestral Suite No. 4 (1935)
Op. 66:  Two Bylinki (Folk Epics) - songs for voice and piano (1933)
Op. 67:  Jubilee March ded. Voroshilov - for the 15th anniversary of the 1917 Revolution, for large orchestra (also arr. piano) (1933)
Op. 68:  Four Poems (after Tagore), for high voice, flute (or violin) and piano (or harp) (1935)
Op. 69:  Musical Paintings from Uzbekistan - Orchestral Suite No. 5 (1935*)
Op. 69a:  An Evening in Georgia, for flute, oboe, clarinet, bassoon and harp  (1935)
 -        Symphony No. 2 "Karelia", without Opus no. (1935)
Op. 70:  Marriage (orchestration of Mussorgsky's opera after Gogol) (1931)
Op. 71:  The Year 1917, (Anniversary March) for children's and mixed choir, concert band and orchestra (also arr. piano) (1932)
Op. 72:  Five Romances for voice, violin, cello and piano (1932)
Op. 73:  Two Duets for high and low voice with piano (after Rodionov) (1932)
Op. 74:  The Last Barricade (opera after Nikolai Kratsyeninnikov) (1932*)
Op. 75:  Three Vocal Quartets for male chorus and piano (after Rodionov) (1931)
 -       Three Kirgiz Songs for voice, flute oboe, clarinet and bassoon, without Opus no. (1931)
Op. 79:  Catalan suite for orchestra (1932*)
- Music for the film Karabugaz (piano score) (Unreleased) (1934)

Opus numbers not in the list

Op. 36:  (1902*)
Op. 76:  (1932*)
Op. 77:  (1932*)
Op. 78:  (1932*)

External links 
 Free Scores by Mikhail Ippolitov-Ivanov at the International Music Score Library Project

 
Ippolitovivanov